Constance Ring is an 1885 Norwegian novel by Amalie Skram. The novel was written in 1883 and was delayed until Amalie was able to publish it.

References

1885 novels
19th-century Norwegian novels